Saulius Kuzminskas (born May 30, 1982) is a Lithuanian former professional basketball player. His younger brother Mindaugas is also a basketball player for the Olimpia Milano.

Professional career
Kuzminskas debuted in 1999 with Sakalai. He briefly played for the California in the NCAA before returning to Lithuania. He played in Šiauliai and then in Lietuvos rytas for a couple of seasons. In 2005, he moved to France to play for the BCM Gravelines, and then to Slovenia to play for Olimpija Ljubljana, where he received limited playing time. In 2007, Kuzminskas moved back to Šiauliai, but after a couple of seasons, left Lithuania again for the neighboring states. He dominated in the Polish Basketball League with Trefl Sopot during the 2009–10 season, averaging 13.9 points, 7.8 rebounds and 1.1 steals per game. In 2011, he returned to Lithuania once more and signed with Rūdupis.

NBA draft
Kuzminskas participated in the 2002 NBA draft, but went undrafted. His brother, Mindaugas, went undrafted as well in 2011, but later played for the New York Knicks.

References

1982 births
Living people
ABA League players
BC Rytas players
BCM Gravelines players
California Golden Bears men's basketball players
Centers (basketball)
EWE Baskets Oldenburg players
KK Olimpija players
Lithuanian men's basketball players
Lithuanian expatriate basketball people in the United States
Basketball players from Vilnius
Vanoli Cremona players